David W. Mack is an American comic book artist and writer, known for his creator-owned series Kabuki and for co-creating with Joe Quesada the Marvel Comics superhero Echo.

Early life
Mack graduated from Ludlow High School in 1990, where he had written and acted in many of the school theatre productions. He gave the commencement address there in 2003. Mack did not attend a specialized art school, but earned scholarships to Northern Kentucky University for five years, a four-year scholarship based on his portfolio of art works, and in his fifth year the Dean's Scholarship for academics. He graduated in 1995 with a BFA in graphic design.

Career
Mack began publishing Kabuki in 1994 with Caliber Press, and later moved the series to Image Comics. It is now released through Marvel Comics' imprint Icon Comics. He completed the first book, Kabuki: Circle of Blood, while still in college. Mack has also worked on such Marvel Comics publications as Daredevil, Alias, New Avengers, and White Tiger.

He was nominated for the 2020 Eisner Award in the categories of Best Painter/Digital Artist, and Best Cover Artist.

Bibliography

Interior artwork
Daredevil, Vol. 2, #16–19, #50 (with writer Brian Bendis, 2000, 2003), #51–55
Daredevil: End of Days #3, #6, #8
Kabuki: Fear The Reaper – 1994
Kabuki: Circle of Blood (vol 1) #1–6
Kabuki: Dreams (vol 2) #1–4
Kabuki: Masks of the Noh (vol 3) #1–4
Kabuki: Skin Deep (vol 4) #1–4
Kabuki: Metamorphosis (vol 5) #1–9
Kabuki: The Alchemy (vol 7) #1–9 Marvel Comics
New Avengers #39 (with writer Brian Bendis, 2008)
Grendel: Black, White & Red (Dark Horse Comics)
Reflections #1–15 (Image Comics & Marvel Comics)
Dream Logic #1–4 (Marvel Comics)
Young Dracula #1–3 (Caliber Comics)

Covers
Jessica Jones #1–18 (2016–2018)
Alias (2001–2004)
Daredevil, Vol. 2, #9–25 (1999–2001)
Green Arrow, Vol. 3, #8 (2011)
Justice League of America, Vol. 2, #44–45, 51–53 (2010–2011)
Miss Marvel, Vol. 2, #6–8 (2007)
Swamp Thing, Vol. 3, #13–15 (2001)
Ultimate Marvel Team Up #15–16 (2002)
White Tiger #1–6 (2006)
The Realm, Vol. 2, #7 (1994)
American Gods, (2017–present)
Shadows
My Ainsel
Vampire: The Masquerade (2020–present)

Writer
Daredevil, Vol. 2, #9–11, #13–15 (with artist Joe Quesada, David Ross, 1999–2000)
Daredevil Vol. 2 #51–55 (2003–2004)
Daredevil End of Days #1–8 (with Brian Michael Bendis, 2012-2013)
Philip K. Dick's: Electric Ant #1–5 (with artist Pascil Alixe, 2010)
SE7ENKabuki: Fear The Reaper – 1994Kabuki: Circle of Blood (vol 1) #1–6 Kabuki: Dreams (vol 2) #1–4Kabuki: Masks of the Noh (vol 3) #1–4Kabuki: Skin Deep (vol 4) #1–4Kabuki: Metamorphosis (vol 5) #1–9Kabuki: Scarab (vol 6) #1–8 Kabuki: The Alchemy (vol 7) #1–9 (Marvel Comics)

Writer/artistCaptain America: The Winter Soldier (2014) Main titles Daredevil, Vol. 2, #51–55 (2003–2004)
Excerpted as "Vision Quest: Echo" in Moonshot: The Indigenous Comics Collective vol. 1, pp. 12–21 (Alternate History Comics, 2015)Dream Logic #1–4 (2010)Kabuki #1–9 (1997)

Children's booksThe Shy Creatures Feiwel & Friends (2007)

References

External links

 
 ImageTexT Jim Casey and Stefan Hall, "The Exotic Other Scripted: Identity and Metamorphosis in David Mack's Kabuki''

Interviews
 David Mack Interview at Pop Syndicate 
 Things You Didn't Know About...David Mack at Pop-topia

1972 births
American comics artists
Artists from Kentucky
Living people
Marvel Comics people
Northern Kentucky University alumni